Poplevino is a rural locality (a village) in Staroselskoye Rural Settlement, Mezhdurechensky District, Vologda Oblast, Russia. The population was 8 as of 2002.

Geography 
Poplevino is located 17 km southwest of Shuyskoye (the district's administrative centre) by road. Obroshino is the nearest rural locality.

References 

Rural localities in Mezhdurechensky District, Vologda Oblast